True Spirit is the debut solo album by American singer and musician Carleen Anderson, released in 1994. The album includes four UK Top 40 singles: "Nervous Breakdown" (No. 27), "Mama Said" (No. 26), "True Spirit" (No. 24) and "Let It Last" (No. 16).

Critical reception

In a retrospective review for AllMusic, Tom Demalon describes Anderson's voice as "warm" and "soulful" and that the album "succeeds in drawing on older R&B vibes and making them sound fresh." He went on to say that the lyrics are "literate and sophisticated", adding that "True Spirit is a gorgeous album that constantly draws in the listener, both musically and spiritually."

Track listing
All tracks written by Carleen Anderson, except where noted.

Personnel
Adapted from AllMusic.
Carleen Anderson – arranger, primary artist, vocals
Amanda Drummond – strings
Ian Green – arranger, instrumentation, mixing, producer
Martin "Max" Heyes – mixing
Nigel Hitchcock – alto and tenor sax
Stephen Hussey – strings
Norman Jay – handclapping
Brendan Lynch – glockenspiel, handclapping, producer, synthesizer
Marco Nelson – bass
Mark E. Nevin – arranger, guitar, handclapping, mellotron
Jake Rea – strings
Timothy Russell – engineer
Steve Sidwell – trumpet
Michael Talbot – keyboards
Crispin Taylor – drums

Charts and certifications

Weekly charts

Certifications

References

External links
True Spirit at Discogs

1994 debut albums
Virgin Records albums
Carleen Anderson albums
Funk albums by American artists